The United Kingdom Haemophilia Centre Doctors' Organisation  before 1993 was known as the United Kingdom Haemophilia Centre Directors Organisation.

The organisation is required by the Department of Health to collect data on Haemophiliacs throughout the UK; this information is stored on the National Haemophilia Database which is managed and run by UKHCDO.

References

Medical associations based in the United Kingdom
Haemophilia